Jurney v. MacCracken, 294 U.S. 125 (1935), was a case in which the Supreme Court of the United States held that Congress has an implicit power to find one in contempt of Congress. During a Senate investigation of airlines and of the U.S. Postmaster General, the attorney William P. MacCracken, Jr. allowed his clients to destroy subpoenaed documents. After a one-week trial on the Senate floor (presided over by the Vice-President of the United States, acting as Senate President), MacCracken, a lawyer and former Assistant Secretary of Commerce for Aeronautics, was found guilty and sentenced to 10 days imprisonment. MacCracken filed a petition of habeas corpus with the federal courts to overturn his arrest, but, after litigation, the U.S. Supreme Court ruled that Congress had acted constitutionally, and denied the petition.

The respondent, Chesley W. Jurney, was the Sergeant at Arms of the Senate, and hence the person with custody of MacCracken.

See also 
 Contempt of Congress
 Air Mail scandal

References

External links
 

1935 in United States case law
United States Supreme Court cases
United States Supreme Court cases of the Hughes Court